Dyschirius peyrierasi is a species of ground beetle in the subfamily Scaritinae. It was described by Basilewsky in 1976.

References

peyrierasi
Beetles described in 1976